= Górki Noteckie =

Coordinates: 52.787°N 15.497°E

Górki Noteckie is a large village on the river Pełcz, located on the railway line from Gorzów Wielkopolski in the Lubusz Voivodeship.

Before 1945 the village was known as Gurkow, a name derived from the Slavic word meaning mountain or hill.

In 1938, the hamlet of Zanzbruch (later renamed Sacznica) across the river Zanze to the south west of the village, became part of the then named Gurkow.
